16th AFCA Awards

Best Film: 
Minari

The 16th Austin Film Critics Association Awards, honoring the best in filmmaking for 2020, were announced on March 19, 2021.

Winners and nominees

References

External links
 Official website

2020 film awards
2020
2020 in Texas